Return of a Citizen (translit. Awdat mowatin) is a 1986 Egyptian drama film directed by Mohamed Khan. It was screened out of competition at the 1987 Cannes Film Festival.

Cast
 Ahmed Abdelaziz
 Mervat Amin
 Yehia El-Fakharany
 Abdel Moneim Ibrahim
 Sherif Mounir
 Husien Sherbini
 Ibrahim Youssri
 Magda Zaki

References

External links

1986 films
1980s Arabic-language films
1986 drama films
Films directed by Mohamed Khan
Egyptian drama films